Adam Bradbury (born 22 August 1991) is an English volleyball player, a member of the club Hylte VBK.

Sporting achievements

Clubs 
English Cup:
  2018
English Championship:
  2018
Swedish Championship:
  2019

References

External links
 Volleybox profile
 CEV profile

1991 births
Living people
English men's volleyball players
English expatriate sportspeople in Sweden
Sportspeople from Stoke-on-Trent